KPMW, also known as Mix 105.5, is an Ethnic/Filipino radio station serving the Maui, Hawaii, United States, area. The station, which is owned by Rey-Cel Broadcasting, Inc. and whose COL is Haliimaile, HI, broadcasts at 105.5 MHz with an ERP of 9 KW. Streaming online at www.kpmwmaui.com

On January 1, 2013, Wild 105.5 changed the brand to the new "Mix 105.5" Maui's Pinoy Hit Music Station. Playing Filipino Music (OPM), Local/Filipino News and Entertainment. Broadcasting 24/7 in Ilocano, Tagalog, and English from Maui, Hawaii, U.S.A.

External links

PMW
Contemporary hit radio stations in the United States